Nationality words link to articles with information on the nation's poetry or literature (for instance, Irish or France).

Events
 Le Mercure galant was founded in France by Donneau de Visé (who ran the paper until his death in 1710). The periodical initially contained only political news, but soon featured occasional verse, light fiction and gossipy letters.

Works published
 Anonymous, Westminster Drollery, The Second Part, first part 1671
 A Collection of Poems, Written upon several Occasions, By Several Persons. Never before in Print, includes poems attributed to John Wilmot, Earl of Rochester, London: Hobart Kemp
 John Phillips, translation, 'Maronides or, Virgil TravestieOther
 Daniel Levi de Barrios also known as Miguel de Barrios, Coro de las Musas, Jewish Spanish poet living in the Netherlands, published in Brussels
 Gian Francesco Bonamico, Mejju gie' bl'Uard, u Zahar, Malta, approximate date
 Nicolas Boileau-Despréaux, Fourth Epistle to the King of France
 René Rapin, Réflexions sur l'usage de l'éloquence de ce temps'', critical essay, Paris; France

Births
Death years link to the corresponding "[year] in poetry" article:
 January 18 – Antoine Houdar de la Motte (died 1732), 59, French poet and author
 May 1 – Joseph Addison (died 1719) was an English essayist and poet

Deaths
Birth years link to the corresponding "[year] in poetry" article:
 April 22 – Georg Stiernhielm (born 1598), Swedish civil servant, linguist and poet#
 September 16 – Anne Bradstreet (born about 1612), called "the chief poetess of Colonial America"
 December 6 – Jasper Mayne (born 1604), English clergyman, translator, minor poet and dramatist
 Zhou Lianggong (born 1612), Chinese poet, essayist and art historian

See also

Poetry
 17th century in poetry
 17th century in literature
 Restoration literature

References

17th-century poetry
Poetry